St Michael's Preparatory School is the largest private preparatory school in Jersey, situated in the parish of St. Saviour. The school acts as a feeder to many British public schools in the United Kingdom.

The school celebrated its 60th anniversary in 2008. It has a pre-prep department (from age 4–7), and a senior school which goes up to age 13. The vast majority of pupils are prepared to take the Common Entrance Examination at 13, although some choose to go to secondary school in Jersey.

Notable alumni
Henry Cavill, film actor known for his portrayal of Superman
Fraser Waters, rugby player
Sir Philip Bailhache, lawyer and politician
Sir Michael Birt, lawyer and politician

See also
List of schools in Jersey

References

External links
School website

Schools in Jersey
Saint Saviour, Jersey